Kenneth or Ken Horton may refer to:

Ken Horton, American television producer
Ken Horton (basketball) (born 1989), American professional basketball player
Ken Horton (curler), Scottish curler